Anomalisipho is a genus of sea snails, marine gastropod mollusks in the family Buccinidae, the true whelks.

Species
According to the World Register of Marine Species (WoRMS), the following species with valid names are included within the genus Anomalosipho :
 Anomalisipho altus (S. Wood, 1848)
 Anomalisipho conulus (Aurivillius, 1885)
 Anomalisipho verkruezeni (Kobelt, 1876)
 Anomalisipho virgata (Friele, 1879)

References

Buccinidae